Idar Olav Norstrand (born 14 February 1915 in Bergen, died 8 September 1986) was a Norwegian civil servant and politician for the Labour Party.

He worked as a mail carrier from 1934 to 1941, and later as personnel director in Norway Post from 1957 to 1982. From 1941 to 1945, during the German occupation of Norway, he fled to Stockholm, Sweden and worked at the Norwegian legation there. From 1946 to 1951 he chaired the post workers' trade union Norsk Postforbund.

From 1964 to 1965, during the fourth cabinet Gerhardsen, he was appointed Minister of Wages and Prices.

References

1915 births
1986 deaths
Government ministers of Norway
Labour Party (Norway) politicians
Politicians from Bergen
Norwegian trade unionists